The Cross della Vallagarina is an annual cross country running competition that is held in mid-January in Rovereto, Italy. The competition derives its name from the Vallagarina valley in which the city is located. It was first held in 1978 following the success of local runner Cristina Tomasini at the 1977 IAAF World Cross Country Championships. She was the inaugural winner of the Cross della Vallagarina, which was unusual in being a women's competition only – the men's race was added later in 1981.

The Cross della Vallagarina is part of the European Athletics permit meeting series, and has also previously been part of the Italian national circuit. It hosted the Italian Cross Country Championships in 2005 and 2007. The race is organised by the local sports club U.S. Quercia Rovereto, which also hosts the city's annual track and field meeting (Palio Città della Quercia) and Giro Podistico di Rovereto road race. 

The current elite men's and women's races are held over 8.8 km and 5.5 km, respectively. The women's competition in 1978 began as a contest over 5 km and has remained roughly this distance throughout its history, except for a brief period where it was extended from 2005 to 2007. The men's race started as an 8 km event, but it has been mostly between 9–10 km for the majority of editions. The competition's looped course features a number of uphill and downhill sections along the valley's edge, making it a difficult race for some athletes. In addition to the elite level races, there are also several races for fun runners and amateurs, ranging from youth competitions to races for masters athletes.

Past winners of the event include some of Italy's most successful runners, including Olympic marathon champion Gelindo Bordin, 1987 World Champion Francesco Panetta, Gabriella Dorio (Olympic gold medallist in the 1500 m) and two-time 5000 m global medallist Roberta Brunet. Foreign winners of the event include multiple European Cross champion Serhiy Lebid, world steeplechase champions Wilson Boit Kipketer and Dorcus Inzikuru, and World Half Marathon champion Wilson Kiprop.

Past senior race winners

Key:

See also
Cinque Mulini
Trofeo Alasport

References

List of winners
Civai, Franco (2011-01-17). Cross della Vallagarina. Association of Road Racing Statisticians. Retrieved on 2011-01-25.

External links
Official website

Cross country running competitions
Athletics competitions in Italy
Recurring sporting events established in 1978
Sport in Trentino
Cross country running in Italy
Annual sporting events in Italy
1978 establishments in Italy
Winter events in Italy
